Penna Sant'Andrea is a town and comune in the province of Teramo in the Abruzzo region of south-eastern Italy.

References

Cities and towns in Abruzzo